This topic covers notable events and articles related to 2008 in music. This year was the peak of record sales in the United States, with sales declining year on year since then.

Specific locations
2008 in British music
2008 in Canadian music
2008 in European music (Continental Europe)
2008 in Irish music
2008 in Japanese music
2008 in New Zealand music
2008 in Norwegian music
2008 in Swedish music
2008 in South Korean music
2008 in west african music

Specific genres 
2008 in rock music
2008 in classical music
2008 in country music
2008 in electro pop music
2008 in heavy metal music
2008 in hip hop music
2008 in Latin music
2008 in jazz
2008 in opera

Events

January 
January 1 – Julia Fischer makes her début as a concert pianist, performing Edvard Grieg's Piano Concerto in A minor with the Junge Deutsche Philharmonie at the Alte Oper, Frankfurt. The concert was conducted by Matthias Pintscher, who replaced Sir Neville Marriner. On the same occasion she also performed the Violin Concerto no. 3 in B minor by Camille Saint-Saëns.
January 5 – The Salzburg Festival launches the "Herbert von Karajan Jubilee Year" with a concert in Salzburg's Grosses Festspielhaus.
January 19–February 3 – Rage Against the Machine headline the Big Day Out festivals in Australia and New Zealand, their first shows outside the United States since reforming, and their first Australian shows in 12 years. They join co-headliners Björk, who pulled out of the Sydney festival under doctor's orders, and Arcade Fire.
January 29 – Face to Face announce that they will reunite for select shows in the US and internationally.
January 31 –  Laura Attwood of the King Edward VI School in Morpeth wins the second Eileen Bowler Award.

February 
February 8 – Michael Jackson's Thriller album, the world's best-selling album of all time, is reissued as Thriller 25 to celebrate its 25th anniversary, with Jackson himself as executive producer.
February 10 – The 50th Annual Grammy Awards ceremony takes place at the Staples Center in Los Angeles, US. Amy Winehouse wins five awards, including both Record of the Year and Song of the Year for "Rehab", along with Best New Artist. Herbie Hancock's River: The Joni Letters wins Album of the Year.
February 11 – After pleading no contest to a felony weapons charge, The Game was sentenced to 60 days in jail, 150 hours of community service, and three years of probation in connection with an incident where he was alleged to have brandished a gun at a basketball game in South Los Angeles in February 2007.
February 19 – System of a Down guitarist, Daron Malakian, tells MTV.com that the band is not likely to reform as he will be concentrating on his new project Scars on Broadway.
February 20–25 – Viña del Mar International Song Festival is held in Chile.
February 23 – March 3 – The second annual Soundwave festival is held in Australia.
February 26 – The Return of the Spice Girls tour comes to a close in Toronto.

March 
March 6–9 – The 2008 Langerado Music Festival is held on the Big Cypress Indian Reservation in southern Florida.
March 7 – The Jakarta International Java Jazz Festival 2008 takes place in Indonesia.
March 7–16 – The 2008 South by Southwest Conference and Festival is held in Austin, Texas, US.
March 11
Jazz musician and broadcaster Humphrey Lyttelton announces his retirement from presenting BBC Radio 2's jazz programme after forty years.
Rick Ross releases his second studio album, Trilla, to mixed reviews.
March 18 – Electronic music duo Crystal Castles releases their eponymous debut album.
March 25–29 – Miami Winter Music Conference.
March 31 – theJazz radio station stops broadcasting.

April 
April 1 – Scott Weiland's departure from rock band Velvet Revolver becomes official. His reunion with his former band, Stone Temple Pilots, and tensions between him and the rest of Velvet Revolver, led to his departure.
April 5
The reunited Face to Face perform together for the first time in four-and-a-half-years at The Bamboozle Left in Irvine, California, US.
Leona Lewis single "Bleeding Love" reached number 1 in 35 countries and became the first song to top the Billboard Hot 100 chart by a female British solo artist in 20 years since Kim Wilde did with "You Keep Me Hangin On" back in 1987. Her single was later proclaimed as the best selling single of 2008 worldwide and Lewis was named Top New Artist by Billboard.
April 12 – "Touch My Body" becomes Mariah Carey's 18th number 1 single on the Billboard Hot 100, putting her into second place among artists with the most number 1 singles in the rock era, and first place as a solo artist, surpassing Elvis Presley.
April 13 – Justin Bieber officially signed to Def Jam Music Group 
April 15 – Mayor Antonio Villaraigosa officially proclaims Mariah Carey Day in Los Angeles, California, US. On this day, Mariah Carey also releases E=MC², her eleventh studio album. It debuts at #1 on the Billboard 200 albums chart with the highest first-week sales of her career.
April 22 – Andrey Baranov of Russia wins First Prize in the Second Benjamin Britten International Violin Competition in London.

May 
May 3 – The sixth annual The Bamboozle festival opens at the Meadowlands Sports Complex, East Rutherford, New Jersey, US.
May 10–11 – The Give It A Name 2008 festival is held at Earls Court, London, UK.
May 14 – The "Spirit of Change" Gospel Choir celebrates its tenth anniversary with the 20th Zündorfer Gospelnacht concert in the Catholic Parish Church of St. Mariae Geburt, in Zündorf.
May 21 – David Cook defeats David Archuleta to win season 7 of American Idol, in a contest decided by 97.5 million votes, a record for the show.
May 24 – 43 countries compete in the 2008 Eurovision Song Contest final in Belgrade, Serbia, including newcomers San Marino and Azerbaijan. The contest is won by Russia, with Believe by Dima Bilan.
May 24–26 – The Sasquatch! Music Festival is held over Memorial Day weekend at The Gorge Amphitheatre in central Washington, US.
May 25 – The Slovak preliminary round of the first Bluegrass competition (toward the annual Czech Festival Banjo Jamboree) is held in Hviezdoslavovo námestie, Bratislava.
May 30 – June 1
 Rock In Rio Lisboa 2008 takes place in Parque da Bela Vista, Chelas, Lisbon, Portugal, continuing on June 5–6.
 The fourth annual Mountain Jam Festival is held in Hunter Mountain, New York, US.

June 
June 1
 Westlife play their 10th anniversary concert at Europe's fourth biggest stadium, Croke Park, in Dublin, Republic of Ireland.
 A fire at Universal Studios in Universal City, California, destroys as many as 175,000 master tapes containing as many as half a million songs by 20th and 21st century artists, some of which had never been released or digitized. The full extent of the damage was not made public until 2019.
June 6-8 – The 2008 Wakarusa Music and Camping Festival is held at Clinton State Park near Lawrence, Kansas, US.
June 10 – Lil Wayne's sixth album Tha Carter III sells 1 million copies in its first week of release.
June 12–15 – The 2008 Bonnaroo Music Festival is held in Manchester, Tennessee, US.
June 13–15 
 The seventh Isle of Wight Festival takes place in Seaclose Park, Newport, Isle of Wight, UK.
 The annual Download Festival takes place at Donington Park in Leicestershire, England. The main stage was headlined by Kiss, The Offspring and Lostprophets, the Tuborg stage by Simple Plan, HIM and Cavalera Conspiracy, and the Gibson stage by The Dillinger Escape Plan, Testament and Jonathan Davis and the SFA.
June 15 – E. Kallai from Hungary wins First Prize in the 11th Carl Fleisch International Violin Competition in Mosonmagyaróvár, Hungary.
June 20 – My Bloody Valentine play their first reunion show at the Roundhouse, London, UK.
June 27–29 – The Eidgenössiches Jodlerfest is held in Lucerne.
June 29 – Release of Guitar Hero: Aerosmith, the first video game in the Guitar Hero series to be based around a single music group.

July 
July 3 – Opening of the O2 Wireless Festival in Hyde Park, London, UK.
July 5 – Staatsminister Rainer Robra and Halberstadt Oberbürgermeister Andreas Henke preside as the notes A and C are added in the sixth sound change of the performance of John Cage's Organ²/ASLSP (As SLow aS Possible) that began on 5 September 2001 and is to conclude on 5 September 2640, in Halberstadt, Germany.
July 23–26 – The 2008 10,000 Lakes Festival is held.
July 24–25 – The Splendour in the Grass music festival is held in Byron Bay, Australia, headlined by Devo and Wolfmother.
July 24–28 – The Fifth International Symposium of throat-singing, "Khoomei—Cultural Phenomenon of the Peoples of Central Asia" is held in Tuva.

August 
August 1–3 – The Lollapalooza music festival takes place in Chicago, Illinois, US.
August 8 – Chen Qigang is director of music for the 2008 Summer Olympics opening ceremony in Beijing.  A minor scandal ensues when it is revealed that Lin Miaoke, the performer of "Ode to the Motherland", was miming to a recording by another girl, Yang Peiyi.
August 10 – Jimmy Dean and Eddie Fisher celebrate their 80th birthdays.
August 12–18 – Sziget Festival 2008 takes place in Budapest, Hungary.
August 13 – Jeff Singer quits Paradise Lost.
August 19 – LeRoi Moore, saxophonist and founding member of Dave Matthews Band, dies from complications from an ATV accident suffered earlier in the summer.
August 22 – Coke Live Music Festival opens in Poland, headlined by artists Sean Paul, Timbaland, and The Prodigy.
August 23
Madonna starts her Sticky & Sweet Tour which is set to become the highest-grossing tour for both a female and solo artist.
Michael Nicklasson quits Dark Tranquility.
August 30 
 Filipino rock band Eraserheads hold their one-night-only reunion concert in the Fort open field, their first concert since 2001. After the 20-minute break, vocalist Ely Buendia is rushed to the hospital because of chest pain due to emotional stress.
 American Idol Season 7 runner-up David Archuleta's debut single "Crush" scores the highest debut of a song on the Billboard Hot 100 by an American Idol finalist not performed on the show. The track opened at No. 2 after selling 166,000 downloads in its first week of release.
August 31 – Chrome Division fires Eddie Guz.

September 
September 6 – Six members of The Specials re-unite at the Bestival as a 'Surprise Act'. They use the name "Terry Hall and Friends", because Jerry Dammers, who owns the band's name, did not participate.
September 7 – The 2008 MTV Video Music Awards are presented at Paramount Studios, Hollywood. Britney Spears' wins Video of the Year, Best Pop Video, and Best Female Video for "Piece of Me". Christina Aguilera also made her return to music since giving birth to her first child with the debut of her single Keeps Gettin' Better.
September 9 – Jessica Simpson releases her first album in two years, Do You Know, her first country album. It goes straight in at No. 1 in the Billboard Country Charts and at No. 4 in the Billboard 200 with sales of 65,000.
September 10 – The 22nd Annual ARIA Music Awards are held in Sydney, Australia, recognizing Australian music in 2008. Dance-punk group The Presets win Album of the Year.
September 11 – Christian Älvestam leaves Scar Symmetry.
September 12 – Season 4 of the Finnish talent contest, Idols, begins.
September 15 – Kris Drever, John McCusker and Roddy Woomble release Before the Ruin.
September 18
Soilwork hires former member, Peter Wichers, to replace Daniel Antonsson, who is fired.
 Ben Folds Five play a sold out reunion show in Chapel Hill, North Carolina, performing the entirety of their 1999 album The Unauthorized Biography of Reinhold Messner, that was filmed for DVD and web release by MySpace in benefit for Operation Smile
 Crystal Castles play their biggest headline show to date, at Electric Ballroom in Camden, London.
September 19 – "Only by the Night" the fourth studio album by American alternative rock band Kings of Leon, released worldwide in September 2008. – Travis Barker and Adam Goldstein (DJ AM) survive a plane crash that claims four lives.
September 20 – P!nk scores her first solo number-one hit in her native US, with "So What".
September 21
At the Gates play their final show.
The Eric Burdon show in Oklahoma is cancelled due to his health problems.
September 24 – Within Temptation release the Black Symphony DVD, featuring the Metropole Orchestra and guest musicians.
September 25 – Paul McCartney performs at Tel Aviv park, his first performance in Israel since The Beatles were banned from the country in 1965.

October 
October 1 – Tina Turner leaves semi-retirement to embark on her Tina!: 50th Anniversary Tour, which grosses over US $130 million.
October 5 – Stephanie Jeong wins the Second Prize (no First Prize is awarded) in the Premio Paganini international violin competition in Genoa.
October 7 – Spotify on-demand music streaming service launches in Sweden.
October 10 – The Fourth Waakirchener Zither Festival takes place in Waakirchen, Bavaria.
October 12 – Opening of the VII Festival Internazionale di Musica e Arte Sacra, in Rome and the Vatican City (until November 30).
October 16 – Britney Spears sets a new record for the biggest jump to number one on the Billboard Hot 100, rising from number 96 to number one in just one week, with her single "Womanizer". It is Spears' first American number one since her debut single "...Baby One More Time". (The record is subsequently broken by Kelly Clarkson). It also garners first-week download sales of 286,000, the biggest opening-week tally by a female artist.
October 18 – Rihanna scores her fifth number one song on the Billboard Hot 100 (as a featured artist on T.I.'s "Live Your Life", which follows "SOS", "Umbrella", "Take a Bow", and "Disturbia"), becoming the leading solo female artist with the most number ones to have charted in this decade until Beyoncé Knowles breaks her record (as a solo artist).
Justin Bieber signed with L.A. Reid Island Records

November 
November 1–9 – The Southbank Centre in London, UK presents "Klang: A Tribute to Stockhausen", a festival curated by Oliver Knussen, with a series of concerts focusing on works from the composer's last decade, including the world premieres of Urantia and Zodiac for Orchestra, as well as late-night performances, lectures, and master classes.
November 2 – The Fauxharmonic Orchestra loses in its debut confrontation with the Baltimore Chamber Orchestra in a Bargemusic concert.
November 4 – Bhimsen Joshi is selected to receive the Bharat Ratna, India's highest civilian honour.
November 6 – Michael Tilson Thomas makes his Philadelphia Orchestra subscription-concert conducting debut.
November 17 – Korean violinist Hyun-Su Shin wins First Prize in the Jacques Thibaud International Violin Competition in Paris
November 23 – 13 years after his disappearance, Manic Street Preachers guitarist Richey Edwards is declared dead in absentia.
 Wes Carr is crowned the winner of the sixth season of Australian Idol, defeating Luke Dickens.
November 24 – The Royal Philharmonic Orchestra announces the appointment of Pinchas Zukerman as principal guest conductor, to begin in January 2009.
November 24 – Kanye West releases his 4th studio album "808s & Heartbreak".

December 
December 9 – Damon Albarn and Graham Coxon say that Blur will reunite for a concert at Hyde Park on July 3, 2009. Tickets for the concert sell out within two minutes of release, and Blur announce another date on July 2, 2009.
December 11 – Elliott Carter celebrates his 100th birthday.
December 13 – Beyoncé Knowles scores her fifth number one song on the Billboard Hot 100 with "Single Ladies (Put a Ring on It)", which followed "Crazy in Love", "Baby Boy", "Check on It", and "Irreplaceable", tying with Rihanna as the leading solo female artist with the most number ones to have charted in this decade.
 Alexandra Burke is named winner of the fifth series of The X Factor UK. JLS are named runner-ups, while Eoghan Quigg and Diana Vickers finish in third and fourth place respectively.
December 22 – Live Nation announce that Madonna's Sticky & Sweet Tour is the highest-grossing tour for a solo artist, with US$280 million in ticket sales and 2,350,282 fans attending the 58 shows during the three-leg tour across Europe and the Americas.

Bands formed 
 See :Category:Musical groups established in 2008

 Bands reformed See :Category:Musical groups reestablished in 2008Returning performers
 AC/DC (first album since 2000)
 Vanessa Amorosi (debut international album and first Australian album since 1999)
 Anastacia (last studio album released in 2004)
 As Friends Rust (reformed after breaking up in 2002)
 Ashanti (last studio album released in 2004)
 Ashlee Simpson (last studio album released in 2005)
 Billy Bragg (first studio album since 2002, first under his own name since 1996)
 Bomb the Bass (first full-length album since 1995)
 Boyzone (first studio album released in 1999)
 Brandy (last studio album released in 2004)
 David Byrne & Brian Eno (first album since 1981)
 Cherry Poppin' Daddies (first album since 2000)
 Counting Crows (first studio album since 2002)
 The Cure (first studio album since 2004)
 Dido (last studio album released in 2003)
 Donna Summer (first studio album since 1991)
 Erykah Badu (first album since 2003)
 Extreme (first studio album since 1995)
 Grace Jones (first studio album since 1989)
 Guns N' Roses (first album of original material since 1991)
 Jason Donovan (first studio album since 1993)
 Lenny Kravitz (first album since 2004)
 Metallica (first album since 2003)
 Mötley Crüe (first album with all members since 1997)
 New Kids on the Block (first album since 1994)
 The Offspring (first album since 2003)
 Paramore (first album since 2007)
 Polvo (first tour since 1998)
 Portishead (First record since 1997)
 Queen (first studio album since 1995, and first with Paul Rodgers on lead vocals)
 The Screaming Jets (first studio album since 2000)
 The Specials (as "Terry Hall and Friends")
 Third Eye Blind (first single/release since 2003)
 Toadies (first album since 2001)
 The Verve (first album since 1997)

 Bands disbanded See Musical groups disestablished in 2008 Bands on hiatus 

 ¡Forward, Russia! (indefinite hiatus)
 Big & Rich (until 2009, due to a neck injury suffered by Big Kenny)
 The Dresden Dolls
 From Autumn to Ashes
 Hell Is for Heroes
 Incubus (on break from touring and recording)
 Monkey Swallows the Universe (indefinite hiatus)
 My Chemical Romance (on an extended break after a US tour)
 Kaddisfly (on hiatus after bassist Kile Brewer left; remaining members now called Waters & Bodies)
 Phantom Planet
 Red Hot Chili Peppers (two-year hiatus)
 Rilo Kiley (due to the success of lead singer Jenny Lewis' solo career)
 Social Distortion (due to their lead singer undertaking a solo tour)
 The Starting Line (indefinite break)
 Velvet Revolver (while looking for a new lead singer)
 Westlife (a one year break)
 Wolfmother (whilst looking for new musicians)
 Yellowcard (indefinitely)

 Albums released 

 Best-selling albums globally & United States

The best-selling records in 2008 according to IFPI:

The best-selling albums in the United States:

Songs released in 2008

 Hit records 

 United States 

Singles which have ranked within Top 10 within the Billboard Hot 100 Hits (excludes those that were #1 in the UK) 

Billboard Year-End Hot 100 singles of 2008

 United Kingdom 
UK Official Top 75 No. 1 Hits
 "4 Minutes" – Madonna featuring Justin Timberlake and Timbaland (4 weeks)
 "All Summer Long" – Kid Rock (1 week)
 "American Boy" – Estelle featuring Kanye West (4 weeks)
 "Closer" – Ne-Yo (1 week)
 "Dance wiv Me" – Dizzee Rascal featuring Calvin Harris and Chrome (4 weeks)
 "Greatest Day" – Take That (1 week)
 "Hallelujah" – Alexandra Burke (2 weeks)
 "Hero" – The X Factor Finalists 2008 (3 weeks)
 "I Kissed a Girl" – Katy Perry (5 weeks)
 "If I Were a Boy" – Beyoncé (1 week)
 "Mercy" – Duffy (5 weeks)
 "Now You're Gone" – Basshunter (5 weeks)
 "The Promise" – Girls Aloud (1 week)
 "Run" – Leona Lewis (2 weeks)
 "Sex on Fire" – Kings of Leon (3 weeks)
 "Singin' in the Rain" – Mint Royale (2 weeks)
 "So What" – Pink (3 weeks)
 "Take a Bow" – Rihanna (2 weeks)
 "That's Not My Name" – The Ting Tings (1 week)
 "Viva la Vida" – Coldplay (1 week)
 "When You Believe" – Leon Jackson (1 week in 2007/2 weeks in 2008)

 Australia 
Australia Official Top 50 No. 1 Hits

Australia Official Top 50 Hits – Singles which have ranked within Top 20

 Other international hits 
"About You Now" – The Saw Doctors
"Algún día" – Julieta Venegas 
"Appelle mon numéro" – Mylène Farmer
"Dégénération" – Mylène Farmer
"Déjame Entrar (Makano song)" – Makano
"Dos Mou Logo Na Sotho" – Mando
"Ein Stern (...der deinen Namen trägt)" – DJ Ötzi and Nik P
"Everything – P-Money
"The Galway Girl" – Sharon Shannon and Mundy
"Gansi" – Edo Maajka
"Hakanaku mo Towa no Kanashi" – Uverworld
"Hot Summer Night (Oh La La La)" – David Tavaré 
"Il avait les mots" – Sheryfa Luna
"Jennie Let Me Love You" – E.M.D.
"Kallai Mattum" – Hariharan
"Me Estás Tentando" – Wisin & Yandel
"Nekade Daleku" – Elena Risteska
"Non ti scordar mai di me" – Giusy Ferreri
"Pehli Nazar Mein" – Atif Aslam 
"Quédate" – Pee Wee
"Rayon de soleil" – William Baldé
"Scheiss Liebe" – LaFee
"Tired of Being Sorry (Laisse le destin l'emporter)" – Enrique Iglesias & Nâdiya
"Traicionera" – Américo

 Classical music 

 Instrumental music 
 Birke J. Bertelsmeier – Quartettstück for string quartet
 Martin Bresnick – Joaquin is Dreaming Elliott Carter
 Concerto for flute and orchestra
 Duetto for violin and cello (first of the Due Duetti)
 Tinntinabulation, for percussion sextet
 Wind Rose, for wind ensemble
 Joël-François Durand – Le Tombeau de Rameau, for flute, viola and harp
 Lorenzo Ferrero
 Freedom Variations, for trumpet and chamber ensemble
 2 Agosto. Prima variazione (from Quatro variazioni su un tema di Banchieri), for organ and orchestra
 Jennifer Higdon – Violin Concerto
 Mehdi Hosseini – Concerto for String Quartet and Chamber Orchestra
 Wojciech Kilar –Paschalis Hymn for mixed choir a cappellaTe Deum, for 4 solo voices, choir and orchestraVeni Creator, for mixed choir and string orchestra
 Arvo Pärt – Symphony No. 4
 Anno Schreier – Berceuse for violin, clarinet, alto-saxophone and piano
 Tan Dun – Piano Concerto The Fire

 Opera 
 Harrison Birtwistle – The Minotaur Howard Shore – The Fly Other 
 Elliott Carter
 On Conversing with Paradise, for baritone and chamber orchestra
 Poems of Louis Zukofsky, for mezzo-soprano and clarinet
 Karl Jenkins
 Stabat Mater Te Deum Musical films Annan ThambiCadillac RecordsDasavathaaramHigh School Musical 3: Senior YearHannah Montana & Miley Cyrus: Best of Both Worlds Concert''

Deaths

January 
January 3 – Henri Chopin, 85, French sound poet
January 10 – Dave Day, 66 (heart attack), American guitarist (The Monks)
January 11 – Pete Candoli, 84 (prostate cancer), American jazz trumpeter
January 13 – Sergejus Larinas, 51, Russian tenor
January 17 – Madeleine Michaud, 105, French librettist
January 19
 Andy Palacio, 47, Belizean Punta musician
 Trevor Taylor, 50 (heart attack), German singer (Bad Boys Blue)
 John Stewart, 68, American singer-songwriter (The Kingston Trio)
January 20 – Tommy McQuater, 93, British jazz trumpeter
January 25 – Evelyn Barbirolli, 97, British oboist
January 30 – Miles Kington, 66, British bassist

February 
February 3 – Jackie Orszaczky, 59, Hungarian jazz bass-guitarist and composer
February 4 – Tata Güines, 77, Cuban percussionist and composer
February 9 – Scot Halpin, 54, American drummer
February 10
 Freddie Bell, 76, American musician
 Inga Nielsen, 61 (cancer), Danish soprano
February 13 – Henri Salvador, 90 (ruptured aneurysm), French singer
February 15 – Willie P. Bennett, 56 (heart attack), Canadian folk singer-songwriter
February 19
 Yegor Letov, 43 (heart stopped), Russian punk singer
 Teo Macero, 82, American jazz saxophonist, record producer and composer
February 21
Joe Gibbs, 65 (heart attack), Jamaican record producer
Neil Chotem, 87, Canadian conductor and composer 
February 24 – Larry Norman, 60, American musician
February 25 – Stephen "Static Major" Garrett, 33, American rapper
February 26 – Buddy Miles, 60, American drummer (Jimi Hendrix's Band of Gypsys)
February 27
 Ray Kane, 82, American slack-key guitarist
 Ivan Rebroff, 76, German singer of traditional Russian music
February 28
 Mike Conley, 48, American punk singer (M.I.A.)
 Mike Smith, 64 (pneumonia), British singer and producer (The Dave Clark Five)

March 
March 2 – Jeff Healey, 41 (cancer), Canadian blues guitarist
March 3
 Giuseppe Di Stefano, 86, Italian tenor
 Norman Smith, 85, British record producer and musician
March 4 – Leonard Rosenman, 83 (heart attack), American composer
March 10 – Dennis Irwin, 56, American double-bass player
March 12 – Alun Hoddinott, 78, British composer
March 13 – Bill Bolick, 90, country musician (The Blue Sky Boys)
March 15 – Mikey Dread, 53 (brain tumor), Jamaican reggae musician and broadcaster
March 16
 Ola Brunkert, 61 (injuries from fall), Swedish session drummer
 Daniel MacMaster, 39 (Group A streptococcal infection), Canadian vocalist (Bonham)
March 21
 Klaus Dinger, 61, German drummer (Neu!)
 Shusha Guppy, 72, Iranian folk-singer and composer
March 22 – Cachao López, 89 (kidney failure), Cuban bassist
March 23 – Neil Aspinall, 66 (lung cancer), British music industry executive
March 29 – Allan Ganley, 77, British jazz drummer
March 30 – Sean LeVert, 39, American vocalist (LeVert)

April 
April 6 – Larry Brown, 63 (respiratory condition), American vocalist (Harold Melvin & The Blue Notes)
April 15
 Sean Costello, 28 (drug overdose), American blues musician
 Brian Davison, 65, British drummer (The Nice)
April 17 – Danny Federici, 58 (melanoma), American rock multi-instrumentalist (E Street Band)
April 20
 Bebe Barron, 82, American electronic music pioneer
 VL Mike, 30 (shot), American rap artist
April 21 – Al Wilson, 68, American singer
April 22 – Paul Davis, American singer-songwriter
April 24
 Tristram Cary, 82, British composer
 Jimmy Giuffre, 86 (pneumonia), American jazz musician
April 25 – Humphrey Lyttelton, 86, British jazz musician
April 26 – Henry Brant, 94, American composer
April 27 – Frances Yeend, 95, American soprano
April 29 – Micky Waller, 66, British drummer

May 
May 4 – Kishan Maharaj, 84, Indian tabla player
May 5 – Jerry Wallace, 79 (congestive heart failure), American country music singer
May 6 – Franz Jackson, 95, American jazz saxophonist
May 8
 Eddy Arnold, 89, American country music singer
 Larry Levine, 80, American audio engineer
May 10 – Leyla Gencer, 79, Turkish soprano
May 11
 Dottie Rambo, 74 (bus accident), American gospel singer
 John Rutsey, 54 or 55 (heart attack), Canadian drummer (Rush)
May 15
 Alexander Courage, 88, American composer
 Bob Florence, 75, American jazz pianist
May 17 – Wilfrid Mellers, 94, British musicologist and composer
May 21 – Siegmund Nissel, 86, Austrian violinist
May 23 – Utah Phillips, 73 (heart disease), American folk singer-songwriter
May 24 – Jimmy McGriff, 72 (multiple sclerosis), American jazz organist
May 25 – Camu Tao, 30 (lung cancer), rapper
May 26 – Earle Hagen, 88, American composer
May 28 – Danny Moss, 80, British jazz saxophonist
May 30
 Campbell Burnap, 68 (cancer), British jazz trombonist and broadcaster
 Nat Temple, 94, British big band leader

June 
June 1 – Al Jones, 62, British folk musician
June 2 – Bo Diddley, 79 (heart failure), American rock and roll and blues singer, songwriter and guitarist
June 4 – Bill Finegan, 91, American jazz pianist and arranger
June 8 – Šaban Bajramović, 72 (heart attack), Serbian Romani musician
June 12 – Danny Davis, 83 (heart attack), American band leader
June 14
 Jamelão, 95 (multiple organ failure), Brazilian samba singer
 Esbjörn Svensson, 44, Swedish jazz pianist (Scuba diving accident)
June 16 – Margaret Kitchin, 94, Swiss pianist
June 17 – Cyd Charisse, 86 (heart attack), American dancer and actress
June 24 – Ira Tucker, 83 (cardiovascular disease), American gospel singer (The Dixie Hummingbirds)
June 27
 Raymond Lefèvre, 78, French easy listening musician
 Daihachi Oguchi, 84 (car accident), Japanese drummer
 Leonard Pennario, 83 (Parkinson's disease), American pianist
June 30 – Ángel Tavira, 83 (kidney complications), Mexican violinist and composer

July 
July 1 – Mel Galley, 60 (esophagus cancer), British guitarist (Whitesnake, Trapeze, Finders Keepers and Phenomena)
July 2 – Natasha Shneider, 52 (cancer), Russian keyboardist and vocalist
July 3
 Harald Heide-Steen Jr., 68 (lung cancer), Norwegian actor, comedian and jazz singer
 Oliver Schroer, 52 (leukemia), Canadian fiddler and composer
July 6 – Bobby Durham, 71, American jazz drummer
July 7 – Hugh Mendl, 88, British record producer
July 13 – Gerald Wiggins, 86, American jazz pianist
July 16 – Jo Stafford, 90 (congestive heart failure), American singer
July 18
 Tauno Marttinen, 95, Finnish composer
 Dennis Townhill, 83, British organist and composer
July 20 – Artie Traum, 65, American folk musician and composer
July 22 – Joe Beck, 62 (lung cancer), American jazz guitarist
July 24 – Norman Dello Joio, 95, American composer
July 25
 Hiram Bullock, 52 (throat cancer), American jazz fusion guitarist
 Johnny Griffin, 80 (heart attack), American jazz saxophonist
July 27 – Horst Stein, 80, German conductor
July 28 – Wendo Kolosoy, 83, Congolese rumba musician
July 31 – Lee Young, 94, American jazz drummer and singer

August 
August 3
 Erik Darling, 74, American folk musician
 Louis Teicher, 83, American pianist
August 4 – Nicola Rescigno, 92, Italian American conductor
August 5
 Robert Hazard, 59, American songwriter
 Reg Lindsay, 79, Australian country music singer
August 10
 Isaac Hayes, 65, American rhythm and blues musician
 Alexander Slobodyanik, 66, Ukrainian pianist
August 11 – Don Helms, 81, American steel guitarist
August 12 – Donald Erb, 81, American composer
August 14 – Lita Roza, 82, British singer
August 15 – Jerry Wexler, 91, American producer
August 16
 Dorival Caymmi, 94, Brazilian singer-songwriter
 Ronnie Drew, 73, Irish folk musician (The Dubliners)
 Johnny Moore, 70, Jamaican trumpeter (The Skatalites)
August 18 – Pervis Jackson, 70, American R&B singer (The Spinners)
August 19 – LeRoi Moore, 46, American saxophonist (Dave Matthews Band)
August 20 – Phil Guy, 68, American blues guitarist
August 21
 Jerry Finn, 39, American record producer
 Buddy Harman, 79, American session drummer
August 25 – Pehr Henrik Nordgren, 64, Finnish composer
August 31 – Jerry Reed, 71, American country musician

September 
September 2 – Arne Domnérus, 83, Swedish jazz saxophonist
September 6 – Nicole Lai, 34 (skin cancer), Singaporean singer
September 7
 Christian Dudek, 42, German drummer (Sodom)
 Dino Dvornik, 44, Croatian singer, songwriter and music producer
 Peter Glossop, 80, British opera singer
September 8
 Bheki Mseleku, 53 (diabetes-related), jazz musician
 Jason Stuart, 39, British keyboardist (Hawkwind)
 Kunnakudi Vaidyanathan, 73, Indian violinist
 Hector Zazou, 60, French composer and producer
September 10 – Vernon Handley, 77, British conductor
September 12
 Marjorie Thomas, 85, British contralto
 Charlie Walker, 81, American country musician
September 15 – Richard Wright, 65, British keyboardist (Pink Floyd)
September 16
 Norman Whitfield, 68, American songwriter and producer
 Andrei Volkonsky, 75, Russian (émigré/defector) composer, conductor and harpsichordist
September 18
 Opal Courtney Jr, 71, American R&B/doo-wop singer (The Spaniels)
 Mauricio Kagel, 76, Argentine composer
September 19
 Earl Palmer, 84, American drummer, member of the Rock and Roll Hall of Fame
 Dick Sudhalter, 70, American jazz trumpeter and critic
September 20 – Nappy Brown, 78, American blues singer
September 22 – Connie Haines, 87, American singer
September 24 – Vice Vukov, 72, Croatian singer
September 25 – Horațiu Rădulescu, 66, Romanian composer
September 26
 Bernadette Greevy, 68, Irish mezzo-soprano
 Yonty Solomon, 71, South African pianist

October 
October 1 – Nick Reynolds, 75, American folk musician
October 3 – Johnny "J", 39, American songwriter, music producer and rapper
October 4
 Levi Kereama, 27, Australian musician
 Alfred Gallodoro, 95, American jazz musician
October 9 – Gidget Gein, 39, American bassist (Marilyn Manson)
October 10
 Alton Ellis, 70, Jamaican rocksteady musician
 Dave Wright, 64 (The Troggs)
October 11
 Russ Hamilton, 78, British singer
 Neal Hefti, 85, American jazz trumpeter and composer
October 13 – Gus Chambers, 52, British vocalist
October 15 – Frankie Venom, 51, Canadian vocalist (Teenage Head)
October 17 – Levi Stubbs, 72, American vocalist (The Four Tops)
October 18
 Peter Gordeno, 69, Burmese singer
 Dave McKenna, 78, American jazz pianist
 Dee Dee Warwick, 63, American soul singer
October 24 – Merl Saunders, 74, American musician
October 27 – Ray Ellis, 85, American musician
October 29 – Mike Baker, 45, American singer (Shadow Gallery)
October 31 – Frank Navetta, 46, American punk rock guitarist (Descendents)

November 
November 1
 Jack Reno, 72, American country singer
 Jimmy Carl Black, 70, American drummer (The Mothers of Invention)
 Nathaniel Mayer, 64, American R&B singer
November 4
 Alan Hazeldine, 60, Scottish conductor and pianist
 Byron Lee, 73, Jamaican musician
November 7 – Jody Reynolds, 75, American singer
November 10 
 Miriam Makeba, 76, South African singer
 Wannes Van de Velde, 71, Belgian folk singer. 
November 12 – Mitch Mitchell, 61, British drummer (The Jimi Hendrix Experience)
November 22 – MC Breed, 37, American rapper
November 23 – Richard Hickox, 60, British conductor
November 24
 Michael Lee, 39, British drummer (The Cult)
 Kenny MacLean, 52, Canadian bassist (Platinum Blonde)
November 26 – Pekka Pohjola, 56, Finnish composer
November 30 – Munetaka Higuchi, 49, Japanese drummer (Loudness)

December 
December 2 – Odetta, 77, American folk musician
December 9
 Steve Isham, 56, American keyboardist (Autograph)
 Dennis Yost, 65, American vocalist (Classics IV)
December 14 – Jay E. Welch, American music teacher and chorus director
December 15
 Davey Graham, 68, British guitarist
 Sandeé, 46, American freestyle singer (Exposé) (Seizure)
December 17
 John Sean Byrne, 61, Irish guitarist (Count Five)
 Feliciano Vierra Tavares, 88, American musician
December 25
 Eartha Kitt, 81, American singer and actress
 Robert Ward, 70, American blues musician
December 27 – Roque Cordero, 91, Panamanian composer
December 28 – Vincent Ford, 68, Jamaican reggae songwriter
December 29 – Freddie Hubbard, 70, American jazz trumpeter

See also 

 List of 2008 albums
 Timeline of musical events

References 

 
2008-related lists
Music-related lists
Music by year